The Citroën World Touring Car Team was the Citroën factory touring car arm of Citroën Racing, which competed in the World Touring Car Championship.

Formation
In 2013, Citroën Racing created a new sub-division, the Citroën World Touring Car Team, in order to begin to run in addition in the 2014 World Touring Car Championship. The Citroën World Touring Car Team was formed in June, 2013, when it was announced that the team will enter WTCC in 2014. 9-time World Rally Champion Sébastien Loeb joined the team instantly and several weeks later the 3-time WTCC champion at the time Yvan Muller joined as Loeb's teammate. Also it was announced that the car that will be used will be Citroën C-Elysée, built to the brand new TC1 regulations.
Loeb and Muller carried out the initial tests of the TC1 prototype of the C-Elysée. Shortly after the end of the 2013 season they were joined by José María López, who was signed to drive the third full-time car of the team. In February, 2014 the team signed Ma Qing Hua to drive the fourth car at selected races.

Results and statistics

2014
In 2014, Citroën won seventeen races out of twenty three, in spite of the inversion of the qualifications grid for the race two and in spite of the 60 kg compensation weight that the Citroën C-Elysée had to carry, as the most competitive car of the championship.

The Citroën World Touring Car Team won fourteen victories out of the first fifteen races of the 2014 WTCC season. The Citroën/Total WTCC Team won the Manufacturer's WTCC Championship, 5 races before the end of the season, after the 2014 Shanghai first race, where Citroën recorded a magnificent one-two-three-four. The Citroën World Touring Car Team pilots also got the three first ranks of the Drivers' World Touring Car Championship.

2015
The pilots of the Citroën-Total WTCC team were Sébastien Loeb, José María López, Yvan Muller and Ma Qing Hua, for the full season in 2015. Citroën dominated this season in the same way it did the previous year with José María López again winning 10 races and the Drivers' Championship. Teammates Yvan Muller and Sébastien Loeb finished second and third respectively, just like they did in 2014. Citroën again won the Manufacturer's Championship.

Citroën also provided a racecar for the Sébastien Loeb Racing Team and its driver : Mehdi Bennani.

2016

Citroën announced their decision to leave the WTCC after the 2016 season, during which they fielded just two cars for José María López and Yvan Muller.

Complete World Touring Car Championship results
(key) (Races in bold indicate pole position) (Races in italics indicate fastest lap)

See also
 Citroën World Rally Team

References

External links
 

2013 establishments in France
2016 disestablishments in France
Citroën
Auto racing teams established in 2013
Auto racing teams disestablished in 2016
French auto racing teams
World Touring Car Championship teams